Grupo Desportivo da Companha Têxtil do Punguè is a Mozambican football club based in Beira. They were relegated from the top division in Mozambican football, Moçambola, in 2014. Their home stadium is Estádio Chiveve.

Têxtil do Punguè was founded on 29 July 1943 and won the Mozambican national championship in 1981.

Achievements
 Moçambola
 1981

Performance in CAF competitions

 CAF Champions League: 1 appearance
1981–82 First Round – Lost against Young Africans 4–1 on aggregate

 CAF Confederation Cup: 1 appearance
2007 Last 32 – Lost against Union Douala 6–0 on aggregate

 CAF Cup: 1 appearance
1997 – withdrew in First Round

References

Football clubs in Mozambique
Association football clubs established in 1943
Beira, Mozambique
Works association football teams